There are over 20,000 Grade II* listed buildings in England. This page is a list of these buildings in the district of Copeland in Cumbria.

List of buildings

|}

See also
 Grade I listed buildings in Cumbria
 Grade II* listed buildings in Cumbria
 Grade II* listed buildings in Allerdale
 Grade II* listed buildings in Barrow-in-Furness (borough)
 Grade II* listed buildings in the City of Carlisle
 Grade II* listed buildings in Eden
 Grade II* listed buildings in South Lakeland

Notes

External links

Lists of Grade II* listed buildings in Cumbria
 
Borough of Copeland